is a railway station in the city of  Nikaho, Akita, Japan, operated by JR East.

Lines
Konoura  Station is served by the Uetsu Main Line, and is located 209.2 km from the terminus of the line at Niitsu Station.

Station layout
The station consists of one side platform and one island platform connected to the station building by a footbridge. The station is staffed. The station building also includes the Nikaho City Library.

Platforms

History
Konoura Station opened on June 30, 1922 as a station on the Japanese Government Railways (JGR) Rikuusai Line. It was switched to the control of the JGR Uetsu Main Line on April 20, 1924. The JGR became the JNR (Japan National Railway) after World War II. With the privatization of the JNR on April 1, 1987, the station came under the control of the East Japan Railway Company.

Passenger statistics
In fiscal 2018, the station was used by an average of 190 passengers daily (boarding passengers only).

Surrounding area
 Shirase Antarctic Expedition Memorial Museum

References

External links

 JR East Station information 

Railway stations in Japan opened in 1922
Railway stations in Akita Prefecture
Uetsu Main Line
Nikaho, Akita